Puller was a post-grunge band formed in the mid-1990s.  They released three full-length albums and one Split EP for Tooth & Nail Records.

Three of Puller's members were also members of For Love Not Lisa, who released two albums for Atlantic Records in the early 1990s.

Members 
The following is a partial list of the members involved in Puller.
 Mike Lewis - Vocals, Guitar
 Geoff Riley - Drums
 Mike Miles - Guitar
 Corey French - Guitar
 Ryan Jewell - Bass
 Clint McBay - Bass
 Wes Sharon - Bass
 Dustin Holt - Bass
 Jeff Bellew

Discography
 Sugarless (1996, Tooth & Nail Records)
 Split EP (with Roadside Monument) (1997, Tooth & Nail Records)
 Closer Than You Think (1998, Tooth & Nail Records)
 Live @ Tom Fest (1999, 6x6)
 What's Mine At Twilight (2001, Tooth & Nail Records)

In addition, Puller was featured on several of Tooth & Nail's compilations in the mid-1990s.

References

External links
 [ Puller at the All-Music Guide]
 Puller at Tooth & Nail Records

Christian rock groups from Oklahoma
Musical groups established in the 1990s